Mohammad Saleh Kilani (died 22 June 2016) was a Jordanian politician. He served as water minister in 1989.

References

Year of birth missing
2016 deaths
Water ministers of Jordan